Sri Lanka is a tropical island situated close to the southern tip of India.
 	
The following is a non-exhaustive list of tarantulas native to Sri Lanka.

Tarantulas
Phylum: Arthropoda   Class: Arachnida
Order: Araneae Family: Theraphosidae

Tarantulas are easily identified by their hairy nature and large size from other commonly encountered spiders. Throughout the world, they are considered as a popular exotic pets, as most of the tarantulas are non-poisonous to humans. In Sri Lanka, the largest known specimens are size of a dinner plate, or size of the palm. There are over 9000 species of tarantulas are described from all over the world, where they are not found in most of the Europe, North America and other Arctic colder regions. They are well distributed in Africa, south of Asia, South America, and Oceania. Indian subcontinent including India and Sri Lanka is home to 15 tarantula species, where India has 7 endemic species and Sri Lanka has 9 endemic species, where another one species is native to both countries.

The species called Poecilotheria amarasekarai is still in debate, whether it is a distinct species or the morph of Poecilotheria rajaei.

The species Poecilotheria hanumavilasumica, thought to be endemic to India, was recently found from Mannar district of Sri Lanka.

The species once classified as Poecilotheria vittata is now identified as the same species of Poecilotheria striata, which is endemic to India.

References

 http://www.tarantupedia.com/selenocosmiinae/poecilotheria
 https://www.wired.com/2013/04/new-giant-tarantula/
 https://www.independent.co.uk/news/science/giant-new-kind-of-tarantula-discovered-in-sri-lanka-8561530.html

L
 
Sri Lanka
Tarantulas
.Sri Lanka